Indalecio Prieto Tuero (30 April 1883 – 11 February 1962) was a Spanish politician, a minister and one of the leading figures of the Spanish Socialist Workers' Party (PSOE) in the years before and during the Second Spanish Republic.

Early life
Born in Oviedo in 1883, his father died when he was six years old. His mother moved him to Bilbao in 1891. From a young age, he survived by selling magazines in the street. He  eventually obtained work as a stenographer at the daily newspaper La Voz de Vizcaya, which led to a position as a copy editor and later a journalist at the rival daily El Liberal. He eventually became the director and owner of the newspaper.

In 1899, at the age of 16, he had joined the PSOE. As a journalist in the first decade of the 20th century, Prieto became a leading figure of socialism in the Basque Country.

Entering politics
Spain's neutrality in World War I greatly benefited Spanish industry and commerce, but those benefits were not reflected in the workers' salaries. The period was one of great social unrest, culminating on August 13, 1917 in a revolutionary general strike. The government's fear of unrest like that of the February Revolution that year in Russia (the October Revolution there was still to come) caused it used the military to put down the general strike. Members of the strike committee were arrested in Madrid. Having been involved in organizing the strike, Prieto fled to France before he could be arrested.

He did not return until April 1918, when he had been elected to the Spanish Congress of Deputies. Very critical of the actions of the government and army during the Rif War, or "War of Melilla" (1919–1926), Prieto spoke out strongly in the Congress after the Battle of Annual (1921). He also addressed the likely responsibility of the king in the imprudent military actions of General Manuel Fernández Silvestre in the Melilla command zone.

Prieto was opposed to Francisco Largo Caballero's line of partial collaboration with the dictatorship of Miguel Primo de Rivera. He had bitter confrontations with both men.

In August 1930, despite the opposition of party leader Julián Besteiro Fernández, Prieto participated in the Pact of San Sebastián. The broad coalition of republican parties proposed doing away with the Spanish monarchy. In that matter, Prieto was supported by Largo Caballero's wing of the party, as the latter believed that the fall of the monarchy was necessary so that socialism could rise to power.

Second Spanish Republic
When the Second Spanish Republic was proclaimed on April 14, 1931, Prieto was named finance minister in the provisional government, presided by Niceto Alcalá-Zamora.

As Minister of Public Works in the 1931–1933 government of Manuel Azaña, he continued and expanded the policy of hydroelectric projects that had been begun during the Primo de Rivera dictatorship, as well as the ambitious plan of infrastructural improvements in Madrid, such as the new Chamartín railway station and the tunnel under Madrid linking it to Atocha railway station. Most of those works that would not be completed until after the 1936–1939 Spanish Civil War.

Unlike Largo Caballero, he opposed the general strike and the failed armed rising in October 1934, but he again fled to France to escape possible prosecution. Before the republic, Prieto had arguably maintained a more radical line than Largo Caballero, but he would now be identified as a relative moderate and opposed Largo Caballero's more revolutionary tendency.

Prieto gave a thrilling campaign speech in Cuenca on 1 May 1936, prior to the 3 May repetition of the February 1936 election in the district in which the Popular Front would face among the right-wing rival José Antonio Primo de Rivera and, after the resignation of General Francisco Franco as candidate, Manuel Casanova. He brought Regenerationist memories and proposed Keynesian measures to develop the domestic market of the country. In words directed towards the firebrand faction of Largo Cabrello, Prieto asked for moderation, discipline and the disregarding of revolutionary excesses that would put the democratic government in peril. The speech in which Prieto also displayed a deep sense of patriotism (he claimed to "carry Spain within his heart" and "in the marrow of his bones") was celebrated by the republican press, and it was received well even by José Antonio, then in prison. However, it was met with hostility among the radicals, deepening the rupture within the party.

Spanish Civil War
After the beginning of the Civil War, when news of the ruthless and systematic executions of Loyalists by the Nationalists, as part of General Mola's policy of instilling terror in their ranks, began to filter to the areas held by the government,  Prieto made a fervent plea to Spanish republicans on 8 August in a radiocast:

However, a couple of weeks after those words, the Modelo Massacre took place in Madrid, much to the dismay of many Popular Front leaders. Saddened, Prieto is recorded as expressing his pessimism with these words: "with this brutality we have lost the war".

In September 1936, after the fall of Talavera de la Reina, in Toledo Province, to the rebels, Largo Caballero became the head of the government, and Prieto became Minister of Marine and Air.

After the May 3–8, 1937 events in Barcelona in which the communists and the government forces tried to establish control over the Workers' Party of Marxist Unification (POUM) and the anarchist Confederación Nacional del Trabajo (CNT), the government of Largo Caballero was replaced by that of Juan Negrín, with Prieto being Minister of Defense. Lacking support from the democratic powers, such as France, the United Kingdom and the United States, the Spanish Republic was subject to severe international isolation during Prieto's last ministry in Spain. Maritime access for Soviet material aid was effectively cut off by the attacks of Italian submarines, and the French border remained closed.

After the defeat of the Spanish Republican Armed Forces on the northern front in October 1937, he offered his resignation, which was rejected. Prieto finally left the government after the March 1938 defeat on the Aragon front after an escalating dispute with the communists.

Exile

He refrained from active political life for the remainder of the war, exiling himself to Mexico. In 1945, toward the end of World War II, he was one of those who attempted to form a republican government-in-exile and hoped to reach an accord with the monarchist opposition to Francisco Franco, the ruler of Spain since the end of the Civil War, with a view to restoring Spanish democracy. The failure of that initiative led to his definitive retirement from active politics. He died in Mexico City in 1962.

In Mexico, he wrote several books, such as Palabras al viento (Words in the Wind, 1942), Discursos en América (Discourses in America, 1944) and at the end of his life, Cartas a un escultor: pequeños detalles de grandes sucesos (Letters to a Sculptor: Small Details of Great events, 1962).

Positions 
Supporting of the notion of further devolution to the Basque Provinces and Navarra, Prieto was greatly opposed to separatism as well as towards the plans of the Basque nationalists in the draft of the Estella Statute, fearing the prospect of the territory becoming a "reactionary Gibraltar and a clerical stronghold".

See also
 Spanish Republican Army

References

Bibliography
 Beevor, Antony. The battle for Spain. The Spanish Civil War 1936–1939. Penguin Books. London. 2006. 
 
 Graham, Helen. The Spanish Civil War. A very short introduction. Oxford University Press. New York. 2005. 
 
 Jackson, Gabriel. The Spanish Republic and the Civil War, 1931–1939. Princeton University Press. 1967. Princeton. 
 
 
 Thomas, Hugh. The Spanish Civil War. Penguin Books. London. 2001.

External links
 

1883 births
1962 deaths
People from Oviedo
Spanish Socialist Workers' Party politicians
Economy and finance ministers of Spain
Members of the Congress of Deputies of the Spanish Restoration
Members of the Congress of Deputies of the Second Spanish Republic
Spanish people of the Spanish Civil War (Republican faction)
Exiles of the Spanish Civil War in Mexico
Defence ministers of Spain
Exiled Spanish politicians
Government ministers during the Second Spanish Republic
Politicians from Bilbao
Politicians from Asturias